Bloody Ridge may refer to:

 Bloody Ridge, Honiara, a suburb of Honiara, Solomon Islands
 Battle of the Bloody Ridge (disambiguation)
 Battle of Bloody Ridge, a 1951 Korean War battle
 Battle of Edson's Ridge, also known as the Battle of the Bloody Ridge, a WW2 battle of Guadalcanal campaign in the Solomon Islands
 Battle of Bloody Ridge (Leyte), a WW2 battle on the Leyte Island during Battle of Leyte
 Battle of Bloody Ridge (Ie Shima), a WW2 battle on the Ie Shima Island (Okinawa prefecture)
Bloody Ridge
 Drumcrow (Irish: Droim Cró or Bloody Ridge), a townland in Kilcronaghan, County Londonderry, Northern Ireland